Yamanokuchi Dam is a gravity dam located in Yamaguchi prefecture in Japan. The dam is used for irrigation. The catchment area of the dam is 2.1 km2. The dam impounds about 7  ha of land when full and can store 690 thousand cubic meters of water. The construction of the dam was started on 1975 and completed in 1984.

References

Dams in Yamaguchi Prefecture
1984 establishments in Japan